Jesper Nordin (born Jesper Loeser Severinsen Nordin, 1975) is a Danish conductor and composer.

Education and work

Early education
Nordin graduated from the Royal Danish Academy of Music in December 2006. His teachers were Giancarlo Andretta, Frans Rasmussen, Tamás Vetö, Dan-Oluf Stenlund. Nordin also had private studies with Janos Fürst.

Conduction work
Since 2004, Nordin has been the assistant conductor at the Royal Danish Opera on over 25 productions, including the complete "Der Ring des Nibelungen" (Richard Wagner) cycle 'The Copenhagen Ring', Die Frau Ohne Schatten, Elektra (Strauss), Wozzeck (Berg), Eugen Onegin (Tschaikovsky), Don Carlo (Verdi), Tosca (Puccini), The Rake's Progress (Stravinsky), Tristan & Isolde, Parsifal (Wagner), Selma Jezkova (Poul Ruders), Don Giovanni, Die Zauberflöte, Le Nozze di Figaro (Mozart) a.o. 

Nordin was the Studienleiter/head  of music at the Royal Danish Opera between 2008 and 2010.
In 2010, Nordin conducted the world premiere of Edina Hadžiselimović's opera "Waiting in nowhere" at the Royal Danish Opera. Nordin also had his first appearance with the Royal Danish Ballet in March 2010 (in Balanchine's "Serenade").

Recent years
Lately, Nordin has appeared often with the Copenhagen Philharmonic Orchestra, the contemporary music ensemble Athelas and several other of Denmark's professional orchestras and ensembles. Since April 1st, 2019, Nordin has been the conductor for the Prince of Denmark's Brass Ensemble (Prinsens Musikkorps, formerly Prinsens Livregiment). Nordin was also appointed Artistic Director of the Aarhus Symphony Orchestra on January 1, 2020.

External links
Professional website
List of Danish Conductors on Wikipedia

1975 births
Danish composers
Male composers
Danish conductors (music)
Male conductors (music)
Living people
21st-century Danish musicians
21st-century composers
21st-century conductors (music)
21st-century male musicians